Calciano is a town and comune in the province of Matera, in the Southern Italian region of Basilicata.

Gallery

References

 Cities and towns in Basilicata